Hanam-eup is an eup, or large village, in Miryang, Gyeongsangnam-do, South Korea.  It stands at the southern tip of Miryang, and looks across the Nakdong River at the northern tips of Gimhae and Changwon.

In the Silla period, Hanam-eup was a bugok, or stipend-village, known as "Susan-bugok" (穿山部曲).  In the Goryeo period, it was raised to the status of a hyeon, and later incorporated into Milseong-bu (now Miryang).

Noted local landmarks include Bronze Age dolmens in Namjeon-ri, and a monument to late Goryeo scholar-official Yi Sin, also in Namjeon-ri.  The Susan-je, a dike believed to date to the Samhan period, is also located in Hanam.

Although some manufacturing is carried out in Hanam, the local economy is dominated by agriculture.  Local specialties include potatoes, strawberries, cabbage, and sweet persimmons.

See also
Haman County

References

External links
   Official website
  Naver Encyclopedia entry

Towns and townships in South Gyeongsang Province
Miryang